The Nomenclature of Territorial Units for Statistics (NUTS) is a geocode standard for referencing the subdivisions of Germany for statistical purposes. The standard is developed and regulated by the European Union. The NUTS standard is instrumental in delivering the European Union's Structural Funds. The NUTS code for Germany is DE and a hierarchy of three levels is established by Eurostat. Below these is a further levels of geographic organisation - the local administrative unit (LAU). In Germany the LAUs 1 is collective municipalities, and the LAU 2 is municipalities.

Overall

NUTS codes

Older Version 
In the 2003 version, before the abolition of the government regions in Sachsen-Anhalt, the codes were as follows
DEE1	Dessau
DEE11	Dessau, Kreisfreie Stadt
DEE12	Anhalt-Zerbst
DEE13	Bernburg
DEE14	Bitterfeld
DEE15	Köthen
DEE16	Wittenberg
DEE2	Halle
DEE21	Halle (Saale), Kreisfreie Stadt
DEE22	Burgenlandkreis
DEE23	Mansfelder Land
DEE24	Merseburg-Querfurt
DEE25	Saalkreis
DEE26	Sangerhausen
DEE27	Weißenfels
DEE3	Magdeburg
DEE31	Magdeburg, Kreisfreie Stadt
DEE32	Aschersleben-Staßfurt
DEE33	Bördekreis
DEE34	Halberstadt
DEE35	Jerichower Land
DEE36	Ohrekreis
DEE37	Stendal
DEE38	Quedlinburg
DEE39	Schönebeck
DEE3A	Wernigerode
DEE3B	Altmarkkreis Salzwedel

Changes

Changes from 2006 to 2010
 BRANDENBURG merged from two regions
 SAXONY restructured after 2008 redistricting legislation

Changes from 2010 to 2013
 MECKLENBURG-VORPOMMERN completely restructured and merged districts

Changes from 2013 to 2016:
DE91C created from merger of old DE915 Göttingen and DE919 Osterode am Harz
Boundary changes for DEB1C (old DEB16) and DEB1D (old DEB19)

See also
 ISO 3166-2 codes of Germany
 FIPS region codes of Germany
 Subdivisions of Germany

References

Sources
 Hierarchical list of the Nomenclature of territorial units for statistics – NUTS and the Statistical regions of Europe
 Overview map of EU Countries – NUTS level 1
 DEUTSCHLAND – NUTS level 2
 DEUTSCHLAND North – NUTS level 3
 DEUTSCHLAND East – NUTS level 3
 DEUTSCHLAND South – NUTS level 3
 DEUTSCHLAND West – NUTS level 3
 Correspondence between the NUTS levels and the national administrative units
 List of current NUTS codes
 Download current NUTS codes (ODS format)
 States of Germany, Statoids.com
 Districts of Germany, Statoids.com

External links
The LAU codes of Germany: 

Germany
Nuts